Acadamh na hOllscolaíochta Gaeilge (English: "The Irish Language University Academy") is a third level educational and research institution headquartered in Galway, Ireland. It was established as part of the University of Galway in 2004, to further the development Irish-medium education. The academy works in co-operation with faculties, departments and other university offices to develop the range and number of programmes that are provided through the medium of Irish on campus and in the academy's Gaeltacht centres.

Locations

The academy operates in four in urban and rural campuses or centres:

 Áras na Gaeilge on the University of Galway's main campus in Galway city
 Áras Mháirtín Uí Chadhain in the Ceathrú Rua in Connemara, Galway
 Ionad an Acadaimh in the Doirí Beaga in Gaoth Dobhair, Donegal
 Áras Shorcha Ní Ghuairim in Carna in Connemara, Galway

History
The importance to any linguistic group of higher education through their own language has long been acknowledged. The foundation in Scotland of the Sabhal Mòr Ostaig, an institute which is comparable to but more substantial than the academy as it is a constituent college of the University of the Highlands and Islands, has been accompanied by a marked increase in the vitality of Scottish Gaelic. While higher education has a long history in Ireland, for most of that history it has been almost exclusively been a pursuit for English-speakers. Many Irish third level institutions provide courses where Irish itself is the object of study, but outside of that it very rare for Irish to be the medium through which a student can achieve the prestige which goes along with the title "graduate" (a notable exception being Fiontar in Dublin City University).

The academy was founded in 2004 under the auspices of the University of Galway to provide a centre of excellence for university studies and research through the Irish language. It was the only third level body where the working language and language of instruction are Ireland's indigenous language until in 2013 when the educational organisation Gaelchultúr was granted its status as a third level institution by the QQI, giving birth to Coláiste na hÉireann.

The academy is not a large body and given its subordinate status to its parent it cannot truly be considered an Irish language university.

Research and service provision

The academy's staff have been involved in the creation of The New Irish-English Dictionary, the Digital Repository of Ireland and other archival projects, providing material and data insights to the national Irish-language broadcaster TG4, and conducting examinations for the national Seal of Accreditation for translators.

It maintains a close relationship with departments of the university in Galway. Given its concentration of Irish language education and research skills, the academy provides services for other bodies such as translation services, language education for NUIG staff, and developing the university's Language Scheme.

It publishes papers on topics including sociolinguistics, technology, pedagogy and translation in its annual scholarly publication, An Reiviú.

Academic
The academy offers university courses of various levels in numerous subjects, primarily in language studies, communication and technology, and indigenous culture. Many courses can be taken full-time or part-time, and some even cater for distance learning. Prospective students can apply directly or through the Central Applications Office, as appropriate. Below is a sample of the programmes which have been delivered.

Undergraduate Programmes
 BA in Communication Studies and Irish
 BA in Irish and Translation Studies
 BA in Applied Irish
 BComm with Irish

Both Translation Studies and Communication Studies can be taken as part of a joint honours degree.

Postgraduate programmes
 MA/Postgraduate Diploma in Conference Interpreting
 Higher Diploma in Applied Irish  
 MA/Postgraduate Diploma in Professional Practice in the Media
 MA/Postgraduate Diploma in Language Studies
 Postgraduate Certificate in Translation Studies
 Postgraduate Certificate in Advanced Irish Skills for Teachers

Other programmes
 Diploma in Web Development
 Diploma in Indigenous Culture
 Diploma in Arts (Film and Multimedia)
 Diploma in Arts (Translation Studies)  
 Diploma in Language Planning and Preservation

Publications
Comprehensive Linguistic Study of the Use of Irish in the Gaeltacht: Principal Findings and Recommendations, Dublin: Acadamh na hOllscolaíochta Gaeilge (National University of Ireland Galway)

Members of the academy produce regular contributions to the interdisciplinary online journal, An Reiviú.

See also
Foras na Gaeilge

Further reading
 The Role of the university in Sustaining Linguistic Minorities – an Irish Case Study by Seosamh MacDonnacha, pages 49–62 in National Languages in Higher Education, 2010, edited by Marjeta Humar and Mojca Žagar Karer
 Education in the Celtic Languages, Irish Medium by Seosamh MacDonnacha, pages 295–296 in The Celts: History, Life, and Culture edited by John T. Koch, Antone Minard. ABC-CLIO, 2012.
 The Role of Capacity Building in the Implementation of the 20-Year Strategy for the Irish Language by Seosamh MacDonnacha, pages 11–20 in Strategies for Minority Languages: Northern Ireland, the Republic of Ireland, and Scotland, edited by John M.Kirk and Dónall P. ÓBaoill. Cló Ollscoil na Banríona, 2011.
 "Les représentations sociolinguistiques de l’irlandais et de son apprentissage : enquêtes dans des établissements secondaires de Galway (République d’Irlande)", Doctoral thesis at  Paul Valéry University, Montpellier III by Lise Catherine CARREL BISAGNI, page 58 (in French)
 A Gaelic University by Arthur E. Clery in Studies: An Irish Quarterly Review, Vol. 6, No. 24 (Dec. 1917), pp. 606–616

References

External links
Official website
An Reiviú
Fiontar

2004 establishments in Ireland
Buildings and structures of the University of Galway
Education in County Donegal
Education in County Galway
Education in Galway (city)
Educational institutions established in 2004
Indigenous education
Irish-language education